The Spirit 201 was a Formula One and Formula Two racing car designed by John Baldwin and Spirit Racing co-founder Gordon Coppuck which was raced in European Formula Two from  to  and in Formula One in 1983.

In Formula Two racing, the car was powered by a 2-litre naturally aspirated engine.

In Formula One, it was powered by the 1.5 litre turbocharged Honda engine. The 201 made its Formula One debut in the hands of Swedish driver Stefan Johansson at the non-championship 1983 Race of Champions at Brands Hatch. There Johansson qualified the car 12th (out of 13, Jean-Louis Schlesser's RAM March did not record a time but still started).

For the team's World Championship debut at the 1983 British Grand Prix at Silverstone, a modified 201C design was produced, which Johansson qualified in a respectable 15th. But engine problems on race morning forced him to drive the 201 in the race, retiring after 5 laps with a broken fuel system. The 201C eventually only raced at the German and Dutch Grands Prix, with the 201 being driven in the other races. The car's best result was a 7th for Johansson in the Netherlands.

Complete Formula One World Championship results
(key)

References

External links
SPIRIT HONDA 201C
results by the Spirit 201C

Spirit Formula One cars